Felice Rubbiani (30 December 1677 – 18 October 1752) was an Italian painter of the Baroque period, mainly depicting still-life subjects.

Biography
He was born in Modena and studied in Bologna under the still-life painter Domenico Bettini. He was called to Modena by the Duke Rinaldo I to help decorations for the wedding of his son Francesco. He was then given a position in the Guarda del Corpo to subsidize his ability to paint.

References

1677 births
1752 deaths
17th-century Italian painters
Italian male painters
18th-century Italian painters
Italian Baroque painters
Italian still life painters
18th-century Italian male artists